James Duncan Farley Jr. (born June 10, 1962) is an American businessman who is the CEO of Ford and a board member of Harley-Davidson. His career in automobiles was inspired by his grandfather, who began work at Henry Ford's River Rouge Plant in 1918.

Background

Farley was born to a banker father in Buenos Aires, Argentina, where he spent his early years, before moving to Greenwich, Connecticut. Before university, Farley attended Portsmouth Abbey School, a college preparatory school in Portsmouth, Rhode Island. He graduated from Georgetown University and then later, the University of California. He is a cousin of the entertainers Chris Farley, Kevin Farley, and John Farley.

Early career

Before joining Ford in November 2007, Farley was group vice president and general manager of Lexus, responsible for all sales, marketing, and customer satisfaction activities for Toyota’s luxury auto brand. From May 2019 to February 2020, Farley served as president, New Business, Technology and Strategy. From June 2017 to May 2019, he served as Executive Vice President and president of Global Markets. From 2015 to 2017, he was CEO and Chairman of Ford Europe.

Senior career
On August 4, 2020, Ford announced that Farley would succeed Jim Hackett as the CEO of Ford on October 1, 2020. At the same time, it was announced that Hackett would retire and become a special advisor. In July 2021, Farley was nominated to join the board of directors for Harley-Davidson by the company's CEO Jochen Zeitz in an effort to revitalize the motorcycle maker and prepare it for an electric future.

References

1962 births
American chief executives in the automobile industry
American manufacturing businesspeople
Ford executives
Georgetown University alumni
Living people
University of California, Los Angeles alumni
American racing drivers
Multimatic Motorsports drivers